Table tennis at the 1997 Southeast Asian Games is being held in the Pertamina Sports Hall, in Simpruk, Jakarta, Indonesia from 12 to 18 October 1997.

Participating nations
A total of 69 athletes from eight nations are competing in table tennis at the 1997 Southeast Asian Games:

Medalists

Medal table

References

External links
 

1997
Southeast Asian Games
Table tennis competitions in Indonesia
1997 Southeast Asian Games events
Sport in Jakarta